The 2007 Tour de Romandie served as the 59th edition of this event now held on the 2007 UCI ProTour. The stage race was held from May 1 through May 6, 2007 in the French-speaking area of Switzerland known as Romandy.

Final standings

General classification 

 UCI ProTour points are not awarded to riders on UCI Continental Team that finish in the top-10 overall or a top-3 stage finish.

Mountains classification

Points classification

Sprints classification

Stages

Prologue – 2007-05-01, Fribourg, 3.5 km ITT 
Italian Paolo Savoldelli repeats his win in last year's prologue with a time of 4 minutes, 35 seconds over the 3.5 kilometer course at 45.82 km/h (28.5 mph).

Stage 1 – 2007-05-02, Granges-Paccot – La Chaux de Fonds, 157 km
Germany's hope for the future Markus Fothen of  took the win after he escaped in the finale together with Francisco Pérez. Fothen beat him in a classical sprint-a-deux. The peloton bunch sprint was just behind the two leaders.

Stage 2 – 2007-05-03, La Chaux de Fonds – Lucens, 167 km
The only real sprinter stage of this edition of the Tour de Romandie was an easy win for Australian rider Robbie McEwen. The  rider held off Borut Božič with ease.

Stage 3 – 2007-05-04, Moudon – Charmey, 163 km
Although the course was really difficult, the favourites did not feel like attacking today. And thus, the escapees got their shot at winning a stage. After a win in the Tirreno Adriatico  cyclist Matteo Bono added another nice win to his palmares. He held of Japan's Beppu in the sprint. Beppu did score the first Pro Tour points ever for Japan though.

Stage 4 – 2007-05-05, Charmey – Pas de Morgins, 156 km
A long break by  rider Gorazd Štangelj finished with 8 kilometers to go. By then, 's Eddy Mazzoleni upped the pace. He thinned out the group until there were about 15 riders left. Attacks followed by José Ángel Gómez Marchante and Sylwester Szmyd. But the only real successful attack was by Spaniard Igor Antón. Dutch rider Thomas Dekker saw the danger and took over from Mazzoleni. As a result, only five riders could follow. American  cyclist Chris Horner attacked with 4 kilometers to go. Dekker replied instantly and with much pain and suffering also Frenchman John Gadret managed to follow. The trio caught up with Anton, who was happy he could sit in last wheel and follow. Although Dekker made the strongest impression and tried to get away twice, it was Anton who took the win. Dekker disputed the win due to a seemingly irregular sprint by Anton. But his protest was denied.

Stage 5 – 2007-05-06, Lausanne, 20 km ITT
In the finishing time trial around Lausanne Thomas Dekker didn't allow his competitors to have any hopes of winning the Tour de Romandie. Only  riders Paolo Savoldelli and Andrey Kashechkin stayed somewhat in the vicinity of Dekker. The young Dutch hope of winning the Tour de France in the future did a triple strike by winning the time trial, the final general classification and the points classification.

The following UCI ProTour and UCI Professional Continental teams were named to the 2007 Tour de Romandie:

Individual 2007 UCI ProTour standings after race
As of May 6, 2007, after the Tour de Romandie

While the top 10 places remained the same, race winner Thomas Dekker scored his first UCI ProTour points and moved into 11th place.  Australian sprinter Robbie McEwen gained three points to jump from 18th to 15th place. Paolo Savoldelli moves into 18th place thanks to the 45 points scored at the Tour de Romandie.

 93 riders (up from 82 riders) have scored at least one point on the 2007 UCI ProTour.

References

External links
 Official site (French)

2007
2007 UCI ProTour
2007 in Swiss sport